Pat Ward (28 December 1926 – 15 March 2003) was a Scottish-born footballer who played as a wing half in the 1950s.

He was born in Dumbarton, and after playing for junior side Glasgow Perthshire he was signed by Hibernian. He made his debut for Hibs on 24 March 1951 against St Mirren, although he did not play many games in his first three seasons. Ward made his breakthrough in 1953–54, with 26 appearances, although after a further 19 matches in the following campaign, he was transferred to Leicester City. In all he played 53 times for Hibs, scoring one goal (against Raith Rovers on 16 October 1954).

He made a total of 57 English Football League appearances for Leicester, and for a time kept Colin Appleton out of the left half position. In the 1957–58 season he made three appearances for Leicester.

Ward left Leicester for Crewe Alexandra, and made 31 League appearances for them before joining Bedford Town.

References 

1926 births
2003 deaths
Sportspeople from Dumbarton
Footballers from West Dunbartonshire
Association football wing halves
English Football League players
Scottish Football League players
Hibernian F.C. players
Leicester City F.C. players
Crewe Alexandra F.C. players
Glasgow Perthshire F.C. players
Bedford Town F.C. players
Scottish footballers